"End Game" is the 14th episode of the third season of the American police drama television series Homicide: Life on the Street. It originally aired on NBC on February 10, 1995. The episode was written by Rogers Turrentine and directed by Lee Bonner. The episode continues a storyline about the shooting of Beau Felton, Kay Howard, and Stanley Bolander.

Plot summary  
Barnfather gives Homicide 48 hours to solve the case of the detective shootings before it is handed over to the Violent Crimes Unit.  The investigation, still led by Frank Pembleton, leads to a new prime suspect:  Gordon Pratt, the resident of the apartment the detectives had mistakenly approached when trying to serve a warrant to Glen Holton. Tim Bayliss, Mitch Drummond, and Pembleton search Pratt's home, parents' house, and workplace before tracking him down in a massage parlor.

Meanwhile, in the hospital, Stanley Bolander, Beau Felton, and Kay Howard are in various stages of recovery from their surgeries.  John Munch and Bolander's ex-wife stay with Bolander to keep him company; he seems fine after his first surgery, but awakens after his second surgery with no memory of who Munch is.

The detectives alternate interrogating Pratt, who reveals himself to be a racist loner pretending to be a highly educated intellectual with a grudge against the concepts of government and society. Bayliss, however, finds Pratt's high school records, and discovers that Pratt's intellectualism is a ruse.  Hoping to rattle a confession out of him, Pembleton tricks Pratt into attempting to translate a passage from Plato, but unlike Pembleton, Pratt cannot read the original Greek, and his radical misinterpretation of Plato's words reveals that he is a fake.  Unfortunately, this strategy backfires on Pembleton, when an angered Pratt demands a lawyer.  The attorney arranges Pratt's release, leading to rising tensions within the Homicide unit and even a physical altercation between Munch and Pembleton.  In the episode's epilogue, Bayliss is called to a crime scene and discovers that Pratt has been shot; reporters question Bayliss whether a police officer seeking revenge for the shootings may have been responsible.

Cultural references 
While searching through Pratt's apartment, the police discover a photograph which echoes Lee Harvey Oswald's infamous "backyard photos," with Pratt himself mimicking Oswald's pose.

References 
1. Kalat, David P. (1998). Homicide: Life on the Street: The Unofficial Companion. Los Angeles, California: Renaissance Books. .

2. Bonner, Lee. (2003). Homicide Life on the Street - Season 3 (episode "End Game"). [DVD]. A&E Home Video.

1995 American television episodes
Homicide: Life on the Street (season 3) episodes